Apheloolithus is an oogenus of fossil eggs from the Late Cretaceous Yuanpu and Pingling Formations of the Nanxiong Basin. Amateur paleontologist Donald Glut, in the appendix of his dinosaur encyclopedia, was unable to find the initial description of it, and speculated that it may not be a valid oogenus.

References

Egg fossils
Maastrichtian life
Late Cretaceous dinosaurs of Asia
Cretaceous China
Fossils of China